RFA Gold Ranger (A130) was a fleet support tanker of the Royal Fleet Auxiliary which first served in World War II.

In December, 1949, she supported Operation Corkscrew by providing aviation fuel at Deception Island for aircraft which helped relieve men of the Falkland Islands Dependencies Survey at Base E on Stonington Island. She later served in the Korean War, and in support of the atomic tests at Mauro Atoll. She was later employed as a support ship for minesweepers during the Indonesian Confrontation.

In 1972 she brought the expedition members of the Joint Services Egmont Islands Expedition (JSEI) from Gan, Addu Atoll to the Egmont Atoll. Led by Sqn Leader "Dickie" Bird RAF, it was the first scuba diving expedition in the Chagos Archipelago. Following its success, a second expedition was undertaken to Danger Island the following year.

References

Ranger-class tankers
1941 ships